West Pensacola is a census-designated place (CDP) in Escambia County, Florida, United States. The population was 21,339 at the 2010 census. It is part of the Pensacola–Ferry Pass–Brent Metropolitan Statistical Area. The CDP area includes the community of Brownsville.

Geography
The elevation of the CDP is 76 feet above sea level.

Demographics

As of the census of 2000, there were 21,939 people, 8,818 households, and 5,502 families residing in the CDP. The racial makeup of the CDP was 58.06% White, 33.69% African American, 1.24% Native American, 3.40% Asian, 0.19% Pacific Islander, 0.75% from other races, and 2.68% from two or more races. Hispanic or Latino of any race were 2.60% of the population.

There were 8,818 households, out of which 30.0% had children under the age of 18 living with them, 35.0% were married couples living together, 22.0% had a female householder with no husband present, and 37.6% were non-families. 30.7% of all households were made up of individuals, and 11.0% had someone living alone who was 65 years of age or older.  The average household size was 2.47 and the average family size was 3.08.

In the CDP, the population was spread out, with 27.8% under the age of 18, 10.1% from 18 to 24, 28.5% from 25 to 44, 20.5% from 45 to 64, and 13.1% who were 65 years of age or older.  The median age was 34 years. For every 100 females, there were 91.2 males.  For every 100 females age 18 and over, there were 87.1 males.

The median income for a household in the CDP was $23,962, and the median income for a family was $29,045. Males had a median income of $24,036 versus $17,945 for females. The per capita income for the CDP was $12,826.  About 20.9% of families and 25.3% of the population were below the poverty line, including 38.7% of those under age 18 and 13.9% of those age 65 or over.

See also
Brownsville-Brent-Goulding, Florida, a single census area recorded during the 1950 Census

References

External links
Detailed information of West Pensacola CDP
Demographic information from the U.S. Census Bureau

Census-designated places in Escambia County, Florida
Pensacola metropolitan area
Census-designated places in Florida